The 2020 United States Senate election in Kentucky was held on November 3, 2020, to elect a member of the United States Senate to represent the Commonwealth of Kentucky, concurrently with the 2020 U.S. presidential election, as well as other elections to the United States Senate, elections to the United States House of Representatives and various state and local elections. Incumbent Republican Senator Mitch McConnell, who had been Senate Majority Leader since 2015 and senator from Kentucky since 1985, won reelection to a seventh term in office. He faced off against former U.S. Marine fighter pilot Amy McGrath and Libertarian Brad Barron.

The Democratic and Republican primaries took place on June 23, 2020. As the primaries neared, the president of the National Bar Association accused officials of carrying out voter suppression. Compared to typical numbers of 3,700, the number of polling stations was reduced to 200 with only one in Louisville. Because a large number of voters voted by mail, absentee ballots were not counted until June 30. In the primary, over 937,000 people requested absentee ballots or voted early, a far greater number than usual.

Despite much speculation about this race being potentially competitive and large amounts of money being poured in to try to defeat McConnell, he wound up winning a seventh term with his largest margin of victory since 2002, defeating McGrath by nearly 20 percentage points. He also won Elliott and Wolfe Counties for the first time, solidifying rural Kentucky's hard swing towards the GOP. This was the first election in which McConnell attained more than 1 million votes.

Republican primary

Candidates

Nominee
 Mitch McConnell, incumbent U.S. Senator and Senate Majority Leader

Eliminated in primary
 Nicholas Alsager
 Paul John Frangedakis, chiropractor (switched to independent write-in candidacy after losing primary)
 Louis Grider, truck driver
 Neren James
 Kenneth Lowndes
 Wesley Morgan, former state representative

Withdrawn
 Wendell K. Crow, businessman and entrepreneur (remained on ballot)
 Karl Das

Results

Democratic primary

Candidates

Nominee
 Amy McGrath, former U.S. Marine fighter pilot and Democratic nominee for Kentucky's 6th congressional district in 2018

Eliminated in primary

 Charles Booker, state representative
Mike Broihier, farmer, educator, and former Marine
 Maggie Joe Hilliard
 Andrew Maynard
 Eric Rothmuller, small business owner
 John R. Sharpensteen
 Bennie J. Smith, local business owner
 Mary Ann Tobin, former Auditor of Kentucky

Withdrawn
 Jimmy Ausbrooks, mental health counselor (endorsed Mike Broihier) (remained on ballot)
 Steven Cox, registered pharmacy technician (endorsed Charles Booker)
 Joshua Paul Edwards
 Kevin Elliott, Assistant Professor of Political Science at Murray State University
 Dr. Loretta Babalmoradi Noble

Declined
 Rocky Adkins, former Minority Leader of the Kentucky House of Representatives and candidate for Governor of Kentucky in 2019
 Andy Beshear, Governor of Kentucky, former Attorney General of Kentucky, and son of former Governor Steve Beshear
 Steve Beshear, former Governor of Kentucky and nominee for the U.S. Senate in 1996
 Jack Conway, former Attorney General of Kentucky, nominee for the U.S. Senate in 2010, nominee for Governor of Kentucky in 2015
 Adam Edelen, former State Auditor and candidate for Governor of Kentucky in 2019
 Greg Fischer, Mayor of Louisville
 Jim Gray, Secretary of the Kentucky Transportation Cabinet, former Mayor of Lexington and nominee for the U.S. Senate in 2016
 Alison Lundergan Grimes, former Secretary of State of Kentucky and nominee for the U.S. Senate in 2014 (endorsed Booker)
 Matt Jones, attorney, media personality, and restaurateur (had formed an exploratory committee beforehand, endorsed Booker)

Campaign
There were debates on March 5, 2020 and June 1, 2020.

Polling

Endorsements

Results

Other candidates

Libertarian primary
The Libertarian Party of Kentucky did not qualify to nominate through the taxpayer-funded primary and held its own privately operated primary on March 8, 2020. Anyone registered Libertarian in the state of Kentucky as of January 1, 2020, could participate. All candidates of the Libertarian Party of Kentucky must defeat None Of The Above (NOTA) to obtain the nomination.

Nominee
Brad Barron, farmer and entrepreneur

Reform Party

Withdrawn
 Derek Leonard Petteys

Independents

Declared
 Daniel Cobble (as a write-in candidate)
 Harold H. Fitzpatrick (as a write-in candidate)
 Paul John Frangedakis (as a write-in candidate) (switched from Republican candidacy after losing primary)
 Randall Lee Teegarden (as a write-in candidate)
 Demetra Wysinger (as a write-in candidate)

Withdrawn
 Alyssa Dara McDowell, independent candidate for president in 2016, 2018 Independent nominee for Kentucky House of Representatives District 65

General election
Despite record breaking fundraising from McGrath and speculation that the race could be competitive, McConnell was handily re-elected. Throughout the general election, McConnell portrayed McGrath as a overly liberal "rioter apologist" and made use of a comment from 2018 where McGrath compared her reaction to Trump being elected in 2016 to how she felt during the September 11 attacks.

Debates 
Complete video of debate, October 12, 2020 - C-SPAN

Predictions

Endorsements

Polling

Graphical summary

Polls

with Charles Booker

with Jim Gray

with Generic Democrat

on whether Mitch McConnell deserves to be re-elected

with Generic Republican and Generic Democrat

Results 
McConnell was announced as the winner on November 3. When pressed for a potential recount of the election amid legal disputes regarding the general, McConnell dismissed the idea since,—"at the risk of bragging, it wasn't very close."

McConnell flipped seven of the ten counties that he had not won in 2014, with Bath, Elliott, Marion, Menifee, Nicholas, Rowan and Wolfe counties all flipping.

See also
 2020 Kentucky elections

Notes
Partisan clients

Voter samples

References

External links
 
 
  (State affiliate of the U.S. League of Women Voters)
 

campaign websites
Brad Barron (L) for Senate 
Mitch McConnell (R) for Senate
Amy McGrath (D) for Senate

2020
Kentucky
United States Senate